Diogo Gonçalo Baptista Pires (born 7 May 1993) is a Portuguese footballer who plays as a midfielder for S.C. Ideal.

Football career
Born in Lisbon, Pires spent most of his youth career with local C.F. Os Belenenses. He made his professional debut on 5 August 2012 while at the service of Atlético Clube de Portugal, coming on as a late substitute in a 1–0 home win against S.C. Covilhã for the first round of the Taça da Liga.

On 15 May 2013, after a loan in the lower leagues at S.U. 1º de Dezembro, Pires signed a two-year contract with Segunda Liga club C.D. Aves. His first match in the competition occurred on 18 August, when he played 18 minutes in the 1–1 away draw to U.D. Oliveirense.

Pires competed in the third level in the following seasons, representing in quick succession G.D. Ribeirão, Clube Oriental de Lisboa, S.C. Ideal and S.U. Sintrense. The exception to this was 2015–16, when he appeared for former side Atlético in the second tier.

References

External links

Portuguese League profile 

1993 births
Living people
Footballers from Lisbon
Portuguese footballers
Association football midfielders
Liga Portugal 2 players
Segunda Divisão players
Atlético Clube de Portugal players
C.D. Aves players
G.D. Ribeirão players
Clube Oriental de Lisboa players
S.U. Sintrense players